Pelto may refer to:

Jonathan Pelto, American politician
Mauri S. Pelto, American professor
Pelto railway station, in Espoo, Finland